House of Cards is the fourteenth studio album by the Canadian progressive rock band Saga, released on 12 February 2001 by Steamhammer. Recorded at Sound Image Studios in Van Nuys, Los Angeles, it was produced by bassist/keyboardist Jim Crichton.

Track listing

The Chapters
Two of the songs, "Ashes To Ashes (Chapter 11)" and "We'll Meet Again (Chapter 15)," were part of a second series of eight songs that Saga included within some of their albums called "The Chapters," which told the story of a young Albert Einstein. These songs were included on The Chapters Live a live album that the band released in 2005.

Personnel
 Michael Sadler - lead and backing vocals, keyboards
 Ian Crichton - guitars, backing vocals
 Jim Gilmour - keyboards, backing and lead vocals
 Jim Crichton - bass, keyboards
 Steve Negus - drums, percussion

Production
 Jim Crichton - Producer
 Eric Fulghum - Artwork

References

2001 albums
Saga (band) albums
SPV/Steamhammer albums